Ellefeld is a municipality in the Vogtlandkreis district in Saxony, Germany.

References

External links 
 Official website of Ellefeld

Municipalities in Saxony
Vogtlandkreis